Susan B. Anthony (1820–1906) was an American political activist.

Susan B. Anthony may also refer to:
 Susan B. Anthony II, American journalist and writer, activist and substance abuse counselor (great-niece of Susan B. Anthony)
 USS Susan B. Anthony (AP-72), a ship
 Susan B. Anthony: A Biography of a Singular Feminist, a 2000 book by Kathleen Barry

See also
 Susan B. Anthony Amendment or the Nineteenth Amendment to the United States Constitution
 Susan B. Anthony Birthplace Museum
 Susan B. Anthony Day
 Susan B. Anthony dollar
 Susan B. Anthony House, the home of Susan B. Anthony for forty years
 Susan B. Anthony List, an anti-abortion non-profit organization in the United States
 Elizabeth Cady Stanton and Susan B. Anthony Papers
 Frederick Douglass–Susan B. Anthony Memorial Bridge, a bridge in Rochester, New York